Interstate Highways in the U.S. state of Connecticut run a total of . Connecticut has three primary highways and five auxiliary highways. Most of the highways are maintained by the Connecticut Department of Transportation, with the exception of Interstate 684, which is maintained by the New York State DOT.

In 1957, Connecticut received approval for the routes of its three primary Interstate highways: I-84, I-91, and I-95. This plan was extended in 1959 to include I-291 and I-491. The first Interstate Highway signs were installed on a completed section of I-91 north of Hartford in 1961. The primary interstates were all completed by 1969 after the last section of I-84 opened between Farmington and Plainville. The rest of the highways were built or renumbered to their current designations by 1994 when a five-mile section of I-291 opened 35 years behind schedule.

Though parts of the Interstate Highway System in Connecticut were previously tolled, all tolls were removed from Connecticut's highways by 1988.

Interstate Highways

Gallery

See also

Connecticut Turnpike

References

External links

Connecticut Department of Transportation
Connecticut Roads from Kurumi

 
Interstate